Michael Paul Harvey (born 21 September 1989) is a British taekwondo practitioner. He is a European champion at bantamweight (under 63 kilograms), a World silver medalist and has competed in the 2008 Summer Olympics in Beijing.

Early life
Harvey grew up in Hyde, Greater Manchester, United Kingdom and as a teenager he attended Longdendale Community Language College in Hollingworth, Hyde.

Taekwondo career
Harvey began the sport of taekwondo at the early age of 5 years old. After many years of success in the junior ranks he made the switch to the senior divisions and made the GB Taekwondo team for the Beijing Olympics in 2008. Michael lost his first bout to World Silver Medalist and now Olympic Champion Guillermo Perez of Mexico on golden point as the match drew to a close and scoreline of 2-2. In the repechage first round match Michael lost to the man who became Afghanistan's first Olympic medalist in history, Rohullah Nikpai. The match finished with a scoreline of 2-1.

Taekwondo medals

References

English male taekwondo practitioners
Taekwondo practitioners at the 2008 Summer Olympics
Olympic taekwondo practitioners of Great Britain
Living people
People from Hyde, Greater Manchester
1989 births
European Taekwondo Championships medalists
World Taekwondo Championships medalists
21st-century British people